A Thousand and One Nights is a 1945 tongue-in-cheek American adventure fantasy film set in the Baghdad of the One Thousand and One Nights, directed by Alfred E. Green and starring Evelyn Keyes, Phil Silvers, Adele Jergens and Cornel Wilde.

It was nominated for two Academy Awards, for Best Art Direction, Color (Stephen Goosson, Rudolph Sternad, Frank Tuttle) and Best Special Effects (Ray Bomba and Lawrence W. Butler).

Plot
Vagabond singer Aladdin (Cornel Wilde) has his hands full keeping his pickpocket friend, Abdullah (Phil Silvers), out of trouble. Abdullah is thought mad as he claims to have been born 1200 years too early, speaks in 1940s slang and knows about television.

When the beautiful Princess Armina (Adele Jergens), the daughter of the Sultan (Dennis Hoey), is borne through the streets in a covered litter, however, it is Aladdin who gets into difficulty. Despite knowing the punishment is death for a commoner to see the princess's face, Aladdin cannot resist. He distracts the guards and slips into the litter. He persuades Armina to let her veil be lifted and is delighted to discover the stories of her beauty are true. He falls in love instantly. She is not so enamored of him, but does not raise an outcry when he slips away.

Later, Aladdin returns to the palace to woo Armina. He is caught and thrown in a cell (where he finds Abdullah) to await execution the next day. A distraught Armina has her trusted servant Novira (Dusty Anderson) steal the key to the cell from the jailer and slip it to Aladdin. Aladdin and Abdullah flee the city, pursued by the Sultan's guards. They hide out in a cave, where Kofir the sorcerer (Richard Hale) is waiting for them. Kofir persuades Aladdin to enter the bowels of the cave to fetch a magic lamp. Aladdin and the uneasy Abdullah dodge a laughing giant (Rex Ingram, dressed and coiffed the same as the genie he portrayed in the 1940 film The Thief of Bagdad) and return with the lamp, only to find that Kofir has blocked the entrance with a giant boulder. Kofir demands the lamp before he will let them out, but Aladdin does not trust him. The sorcerer leaves them to die of thirst and starvation.

When a frustrated Aladdin throws the lamp away, a redheaded female genie (Evelyn Keyes) appears and instructs him to rub the lamp, which makes him her master. She explains that only her master can see or hear her. She insists he call her Babs, and like Abdullah, behaves and talks like she is from the twentieth century. He orders her to get them out of the cave. He then decides to go back for the princess, much to the genie's disappointment (as she has fallen in love with him), and has her conjure up a retinue of servants, clothes and rich gifts.

Meanwhile, the Sultan's twin brother, Prince Hadji (also played by Dennis Hoey, with a British accent in both roles), who has already tried to overthrow his brother once before, makes the Sultan his captive and takes his place undetected. Hadji is aided by the treacherous Grand Wazir Abu-Hassan (Philip Van Zandt), who is promised Armina's hand in marriage as a reward.

When Aladdin shows up pretending to be a prince of Hindustan, however, the Sultan changes his mind, preferring a rich son-in-law. The genie, however, does her best to derail the romance. Spotting Kofir, who has watched the proceedings through his magic crystal and is pretending to be a merchant offering new lamps for old, the genie arranges for the unsuspecting Novira to exchange the magic lamp. Once Kofir becomes the genie's master, everything that Aladdin wished for disappears, including the gift robe the false Sultan is wearing for the wedding. Armina realizes the man is not her father, but Prince Hadji, as he does not have a scar on his arm. Aladdin and Abdullah are taken away to be hanged, but Abu-Hassan offers to spare their lives if Armina agrees to marry him.

Aladdin is set free, believing Armina was only toying with him. Later, however, Novira tells him the truth. He and Abdullah track Kofir down and discover that he was overcome with excitement and died of a stroke. They steal the lamp from its next owner, a tailor, and return to the palace. At the end of a sword fight (in which Wilde gets to display his fencing skills), Hadji dies, and the grateful Sultan agrees to Aladdin and Armina's marriage.

Aladdin frees the heartbroken genie. She has an idea. She conjures up Aladdin's twin, who is in love with her. To reward Abdullah, she gives him Frank Sinatra's voice to entrance the harem girls.

Cast

Reception
Dennis Schwartz described the film as "an attractive looking but buffoonish satire on the Arabian Nights" and stated "the laughs are hard to come by and are more unintentional than intentional."

References

External links
 
 
 
 
Review of film at Variety
 Photos of Janis Carter in A Thousand and One Nights by Ned Scott

1945 films
1940s fantasy adventure films
Columbia Pictures films
American fantasy adventure films
American fantasy comedy films
Films directed by Alfred E. Green
Films based on One Thousand and One Nights
Films set in Baghdad
Films produced by Samuel Bischoff
Works based on Aladdin
1940s English-language films
1940s American films